Alfonso Crespo, 6th Count of Castillo Fiel, (in full), (18 February 1873 – ?), was a Spanish nobleman.

Crespo was born in Málaga, the son of don Eduardo Antonio Crespo y Gálvez del Postigo, and of María Martín-Romero y Godoy di Bassano, 5th Countess of Castillo Fiel. He succeeded to his mother titles in 1904, and was given the Coat of Arms of Tudó by Royal Order of 29 October 1906. He was Governor of Ávila, Gentleman of the Chamber of HM with exercise and Grand Cross of the Order of Agricultural Merit.

He married in Madrid, on 8 May 1905 Doña Isabel Gil-Delgado y Pineda (6 July 1870 - 24 January 1917), daughter of the Counts of Berberana, and they had an only son: Carlos Crespo, 7th Count of Castillo Fiel

Sources

1873 births
Alfonso 06
Year of death unknown